William or Bill Carey may refer to:

 William Carey (courtier) (c. 1500–1528), courtier of King Henry VIII of England
 William Carey (missionary) (1761–1834), English Baptist missionary, philologist, orientalist, translator
 William Carey University, Mississippi
 William Carey (MP) (died 1593), MP for Morpeth and Northumberland
 William Carey (bishop) (1769–1846), English churchman and headmaster, bishop of Exeter and of St Asaph
 William Carey (politician) (1887–1928), Australian politician
 William P. Carey (1930–2012), American businessman
 William D. Carey (1912–1998), publisher of Science, 1975–1987
 William Carey (Guernsey) (1853–1915), Bailiff of Guernsey
 William Paulet Carey (1759–1839), Irish art critic and publicist
 William R. Carey (1806–1836), volunteer soldier during the Texas Revolution
 Bill Carey (songwriter) (1916–2004), American songwriter
 Bill Carey (comedian), member of the Ogden Edsl  band
 Bill Carey (footballer) (1905–1973), Australian rules footballer for Hawthorn
 Bill Carey (curler) (born 1954), Canadian curler and coach

See also
William Cary (disambiguation)

Carey, William